Zhang Jianzhong (born 18 September 1985) is a Chinese former professional association football player.

Career statistics in Hong Kong
As of 3 September 2009

External links
 Zhang Jianzhong at HKFA
 
  
 SCAA Official Blog 16號 張健忠 (Zhang Jian Zhong) 

1985 births
Living people
Chinese footballers
Footballers from Guangzhou
Association football goalkeepers
Hong Kong First Division League players
South China AA players
Expatriate footballers in Hong Kong
Sun Hei SC players
Chinese expatriate sportspeople in Hong Kong
21st-century Chinese people